Leucopholiota is a genus of fungi in the family Squamanitaceae. Basidiocarps (fruit bodies) are agarics (gilled mushrooms}. Two species are currently known, both from north temperate areas: Leucopholiota decorosa and Leucopholiota lignicola.

References

Agaricales genera